Marine Parade MRT station is a future underground Mass Rapid Transit station on the Thomson–East Coast line in Marine Parade, Singapore.

Located underneath Marine Parade Road near the junction of Marine Parade Central, the station will serve the nearby housing estates as well as Parkway Parade, hotels and I12 Katong.

History
On 15 August 2014, the Land Transport Authority (LTA) announced that Marine Parade station would be part of the proposed Thomson–East Coast line (TEL). The station will be constructed as part of Phase 4, consisting of 8 stations between Founders' Memorial and Bayshore, and is expected to be completed in 2024.

Contract T307 for the design and construction of Marine Parade Station was awarded to Samsung C&T Corporation at a sum of S$555 million in November 2015. Construction has started in 2016, with expected completion in 2024. To facilitate the station's construction, the junction between Joo Chiat Road and Marine Parade Road had to be closed from 9 April to 12 November 2017.

Initially expected to open in 2023, the restrictions on the construction due to the COVID-19 pandemic has led to delays in the construction of the TEL, and the completion date was pushed to 2024.

References

External links

Proposed railway stations in Singapore
Mass Rapid Transit (Singapore) stations
Railway stations scheduled to open in 2024